Greta Martinelli (born 3 December 2000) is an Italian rower.

She won a gold medal in the Lightweight Women's Quadruple Sculls category at the 2019 World Rowing Championships.

References

External links

2000 births
Living people
Italian female rowers
World Rowing Championships medalists for Italy